"Twist" is a song by English electronic music duo Goldfrapp from their second studio album, Black Cherry (2003). It was released on 3 November 2003 as the album's third single. The song received positive reviews from music critics and was a minor success in the United Kingdom, peaking at number 31 on the UK Singles Chart. In the United States, the single reached number 18 on Billboards Hot Dance Singles Sales chart.

In an interview with New Beats, Alison Goldfrapp described the genesis of the song:

It's a sort of sexual fantasy that I had about a boy who worked at the fairground, who I lusted after. He was in control and I wasn't cause I was sat on the waltzer and he was the one that was spinning it around and—I don't know—it's sort of lust, adolescent, awakening, smells and noise and dirt. That's what "Twist" is about.

Track listings

 CD1 (UK)
 "Twist" (Single Mix) – 3:33
 "Yes Sir" – 3:57
 "Deer Stop" (Live at Somerset House)* – 4:20

 CD2 (UK)
 "Twist" (Jacques Lu Cont's Conversion Perversion Mix) – 6:48
 "Forever" (Mountaineers Remix) – 3:54
 "Twist" (Dimitri Tikovoï Remix) – 6:30

 DVD single (UK)
 "Twist" (Live in London – Short film feat. Interview)
 "Train" (Live in London)* – 5:10
 "Strict Machine" (Live in London)* – 4:55

 Digital single
 "Twist" (Single Mix) – 3:31
 "Yes Sir" – 3:57
 "Deer Stop" (Live at Somerset House)* – 4:20
 "Train" (Live in London)* – 5:10
 "Strict Machine" (Live at Somerset House)* – 4:55
 "Twist" (Jacques Lu Cont's Conversion Perversion Mix) – 6:46
 "Twist" (Jacques Lu Cont's Conversion Perversion Dub) – 6:43
 "Yes Sir" (Extended Mix) – 8:31
 "Forever" (Mountaineers Remix) – 3:52
 "Twist" (Dimitri Tikovoï Remix) – 6:30

 *Recorded at Somerset House, 13 July 2003.

Charts

References

2003 singles
2003 songs
Goldfrapp songs
Mute Records singles
Songs written by Alison Goldfrapp
Songs written by Will Gregory